Queen's was a federal electoral district in New Brunswick, Canada, that was represented in the House of Commons of Canada from 1867 to 1896.

It was created by the British North America Act of 1867. It consisted of the County of Queen's. It was abolished in 1892 when it was merged into Sunbury—Queen's riding.

Members of Parliament

This riding elected the following Members of Parliament:

Election results

By-election: On Mr. Baird's resignation because his election was contested, 24 November 1887

N.B. The Canadian Directory of Parliament states that George Frederick Baird was declared duly elected by a court decision.

By-election: On Mr. King being declared not duly elected, 25 February 1892, George Frederick Baird was declared elected by a court decision.

See also 

 List of Canadian federal electoral districts
 Past Canadian electoral districts

External links
Riding history from the Library of Parliament

Former federal electoral districts of New Brunswick